{{Infobox UK legislation
|short_title          = Poynings' Law{{efn|''Poynings' Act, 1495 in the Republic of Ireland}}
|type                 = Act
|parliament           = Parliament of Ireland
|long_title           = An Act confirming all the Statutes made in England
|year                 = 1494
|citation             = 10 Hen.7 c.22 (The Irish Statutes numbering)10 Hen.7 c.39 (Analecta Hibernica numbering)
|introduced_by        = Probably Sir Edward Poynings, Lord Deputy of Ireland
|territorial_extent   = Ireland
|royal_assent         = 
|commencement         = 1 December 1494
|repeal_date          = 8 May 2007 (Republic of Ireland)
|amends               = 
|replaces             = 
|primary_legislation  = 
|eu_directives        = 
|amendments           = 
|related_legislation  = 
|repealing_legislation= Statute Law Revision Act 2007 (Republic of Ireland)
|status               = 
|status_EW            = 
|status_Scot          = 
|status_IE            = Repealed
|status_NI            = Still in force
|original_text        = https://books.google.com/books?id=HXhaAAAAYAAJ&pg=PA56
|legislation_history  = 
|use_new_UK-LEG       = yes
|UK-LEG_title         = Poynings' Law 1495
|revised_text         = 
|theyworkforyou       = 
|millbankhansard      = 
|collapsed            = 
}}An Act confirming all the Statutes made in England (10 Hen.7 c.22; short title Poynings' Law in Northern Ireland and Poynings' Act 1495''' in the Republic of Ireland) is an act passed by the Parliament of Ireland which gave all statutes "late made" by the Parliament of England the force of law in the Lordship of Ireland. It was passed by Poynings' Parliament, along with other acts strengthening English law in Ireland, one of which was commonly called "Poynings' Law" until its virtual repeal by the Constitution of 1782.

Many of the English acts adopted by Poynings' Law  were repealed with respect to Ireland by the Statute Law (Ireland) Revision Act 1872, having already been repealed with respect to England by the Statute Law Revision Act 1863 and others.  Poynings' Law itself remains in force in Northern Ireland. In the republic, it was repealed by the Statute Law Revision Act 2007, without thereby repealing the English statutes it referred to, a few of which remain in force.

Notes

References

Sources

Citations

1490s in law
1494 in Ireland
Irish constitutional law
Acts of the Parliament of Ireland (pre-1801)